Kumbhabhishekam, also known as Samprokshanam is a Hindu temple ritual that is believed to homogenize, synergize and unite the mystic powers of the deity. It is part of the consecration ceremony of Hindu temples. Kumbha means the Head and denotes the Shikhara or Crown of the Temple (usually in the gopuram) and abhisekam or prokshanam is ritual bathing. Kumbhabhishekam is widely celebrated as a festival in South India.

On the appointed day and at an auspicious time, the Kumbha is bathed with the charged and sanctified holy waters in the sacrificial pot and, by a mystic process, these pranic powers trickle down a silver wire and enter the deity installed inside the sanctum sanctorum of the temple. The deity, which was until then only a granite sculptured stone image, is believed to transform into a vibrant and vivid living representation of the deva with innate beatitude, grace and grandeur, conferring divine blessings on all devotees.

Ashtabandhanam

Ashta means 8 in Sanskrit and Bandhanam means tying or fixing. Ashtabandhanam is the process of affixing an icon to its pedestal (peetham) with a clay-like paste made of 8 specific herbs mixed with wood lac, limestone powder, resin, red ochre, beeswax and butter. The paste is formed into long rolls about 2 cm thick and applied directly around the base of the icon, so that the cemented joints become watertight. This process is believed to keep the icon rejuvenated for a period of 12 years.  When the Bandhanam is performed with gold (Swarnabandhanam), the rejuvenating power of the deity is believed to last for a period of 100 years. 

The '''Ashtabandhanam' paste is pliable like rubber. Through repeated interactions with abhishekha dravyams - materials used to bathe the icon during daily worship like water, milk, buttermilk, sandal paste and oils - and atmospheric oxidants, the paste loses its flexibility, becomes rigid and gets riddled with a lot of fissures. Through these fissures, the abhisheka dravyams percolate and attack the Yantra embedded under the peetham, obliterating the Bijaksharamantras -- mantras of sacred syllables (bija) -- that are inscribed on the Yantra, and this is  believed to contribute to the lowering of the pranic spiritual power of the deity with the passage of time.

References

Rituals in Hindu worship